Iyáh-Gbẹdẹ is a town located off Km 20 of the Kabba-Ilorin federal highway, and along the Ayegunle-Abuji Road. It is in Ijumu local government area of Kogi State, central Nigeria. It is 300 kilometers away from Abuja, the country's capital, 430 kilometers from Lagos, and 23 kilometers from Kabba town. It has the GPS coordinates 7.85674 / 5.94916 and Postcode 261103.

It is in Kogi West senatorial district and Kabba/Ijumu federal constituency, and is one of the Ten "Gbede" towns that consist of Ayegunle,  Ayetoro, Agringbon-Oke,  Araromi, Ayeh, Iluhafon, Iluagba, Iyáh, Odokoro, and Okoro.  Inhabitants of Iyáh-Gbẹdẹ speak a local variant of  Okun  and Gbede, which are dialects of the Yoruba language.

Iyáh is known for its beautiful scenic views and shares boundaries with Ayegunle Gbede and Ayetoro Gbede. The boundary between Iyáh and Ayetoro is delineated by Jemibewon International Academy, while the boundary with Ayegunle is at a stream called "Omi Oso".
Iyah setting clearly shows much effort in town planning has been deployed with no structures or building near the major road allowed except it complies with a setback up to 3 metres from the main Abuji road.  The town is well-known for its high quality palm wine; people from the surrounding villages and towns in  Okunland visit Iyáh weekly, to enjoy her palm wine more like modern day winnery. The town is also famous for its "Egungun Epa" annual masquerade festival, which is one of the tourist attractions in Kogi State.
Home and abroad, Iyah indigenes are known for hard work and industriousness. They are peaceable, agreeable and good neighbours.
Some of the prominent families in the town include the Ayinmodes, the Jemibewons, the Mowaiyes, the Ologes, the Ayenis, the Omoles, the Fagbemis, the Jeminiwas, the Afolabis, the Ehalaiyes, the Dijis, the Faonis, the Meyanbes, the Bolufawis, the Alemedes, the Anjorins, the Jaiyeolas, the Oloniyos, the Osawus, the Obaniwas, the Elebiyos, Ogunbaiyejes, the Orenibis, the Jemirins, the Emonisayes, the Agodis, the Aiyepekus, the Alemedes, the Kunles, the Ayemowas, the Olorundares, the Olorunyomis, the Yusufs, the Ayiguns etc. Some of the schools in Iyáh-Gbẹdẹ are Calvary Academy Nursery and Primary School, Baptist LGEA School, Rehoboth Faith Academy, De-International Success Academy Nursery and Primary School, UBE Junior Secondary School,  Baptist Secondary Commercial School, and Jemibewon International Academy.

History
The name of the original village was derived from the term "Iyáh ni" which means "fast to reach", due to its strategic central location amongst the neighbouring towns and villages. The original Iyáh settlement is believed to have been founded by Owa from Ile-Ife. The people of Iyáh-Gbẹdẹ have been renowned as great warriors from ancient times, particularly during the Nupe wars of the 19th century.

The history of Iyáh-Gbẹdẹ began at the village's old site called "Iyáh lókè", situated approximately 4 kilometers up the hill from the present settlement. "Iyáh lókè" grew into a big village with three main suburbs called "Oke meta". These are Okeya, Okekiti and Ganran. The present settlement started with movement from "Iyáh lókè" circa 1965/66 and was completed in 1985 - a total period of about 20 years. The town's Postal Agency was officially opened on 25 February 1978.

On 9 January 2017, fifty-five year old Chief Ayeni Olusegun Williams, who hails from Iyáh-Gbẹdẹ, was elected as the 4th Olujumu of Ijumu Kingdom, sequel the demise of the previous Olujumu, late Oba Jerome Sumonu in 2014. The current Olu (king) of Iyáh-Gbẹdẹ, His Royal Highness Oba David Ibitayo Faleke, was crowned in July 2017. Iyah has been blessed with great and notable rulers and Oba Phillip Jeminiwa Eleah I a well respected Oba who reign peacefully for over 40 years  is a particularly notable one. He was famed for his wisdom and problem solving insights amongst the Obas and leaders of thoughts throughout Ijumu and Okun community. Others include Oba Gideon Esemikose, Oba Olusegun and Oba Alemede.

As part of efforts to document the history of the town, a book titled "The Story of Iyah Gbẹdẹ" has been written by Chief Sam Adejuwon Ayinmode. The town is also mentioned in the book "The Okun People of Nigeria" authored by John Otitoju.

References 

Wikipedia:WikiProject Council/Directory/Geographical/Africa

Populated places in Kogi State
Towns in Nigeria
Towns in Yorubaland